The Einstossflammenwerfer 46 was a hand held single shot flamethrower designed in Germany during the second half of World War II and introduced in 1944; it was engineered to be both cheap and easily mass-produced.
It was issued to the Volkssturm or the Werwolf movement, but also used by the Fallschirmjäger (German paratroopers).
It was inspired by the Italian "Lanciafiamme Mod. 41 d'assalto"

See also
 Flammenwerfer 35
 Flammenwerfer M.16.
 Handflammpatrone

References

External links
An original image of the weapon

World War II infantry weapons of Germany
Flamethrowers
Weapons and ammunition introduced in 1944